Building the Commune is a 2016 book by sociologist and philosopher George Ciccariello-Maher. In this work Maher focuses on the participatory democratic nature of the Venezuelan commune system focusing on the history of this institution developing within the poor barios of Venezuela during the economic troubles of the 1980s and 1990s and their political growth under the Hugo Chávez presidency.

Reception 
According to Stephen Pimpare, "It is a thoughtful, far-ranging, and provocative book, and an important intervention."

References 

2016 non-fiction books
Books about Venezuela
Verso Books books